Garbage Man may refer to:
a waste collector, a person who goes to houses and businesses to collect waste and take it to a landfill, incinerator, or waste facility.
"Garbage Man," a song by G. Love and Special Sauce from their 1994 album G. Love and Special Sauce
In Vigilante 8 and Vigilante 8: Second Offense, the stranded Y the Alien adopts it as an alias, traveling the country in a garbage truck and collecting scrap to repair his totaled ship with.
"Garbage Man," a song by punk rock band The Cramps off their 1980 album, Songs The Lord Taught Us.
"Garbage Man," a Swamp Thing-style DC Comics character created by Aaron Lopresti featured in the anthology mini-series Weird Worlds and My Greatest Adventure.